Michael Lessky (born 16 August 1960) is an Austrian conductor.

Life 
In 1986, he began his conductor training with Karl Österreicher at the Vienna Academy of Music, which he completed in 1992. Between 1991 and 1995, he was a guest conductor with Claudio Abbado at the Vienna State Opera and the Gustav Mahler Youth Orchestra.

In 1983, Lessky founded the Capella Francescana and in 1997 the Junge Philharmonie Wien. He completed performances and created CD productions with international soloists at home and abroad, focusing on the works of Franz Schubert, Gustav Mahler and Anton Bruckner.

References

External links 
 
 

20th-century Austrian conductors (music)
Male conductors (music)
20th-century Austrian male musicians
1960 births
Living people
Musicians from Vienna